Rosario Francisca María Balmaceda Holley (born 26 March 1999) is a Chilean footballer who plays as a midfielder for Brazilian side Palmeiras and the Chile women's national team.

Club career
In March 2023, she moved abroad and joined Brazilian side Palmeiras.

International career
Balmaceda represented Chile at two South American U-20 Women's Championship editions (2015 and 2018) and the 2016 South American U-17 Women's Championship. She made her senior debut on 15 September 2017 in a 0–1 friendly loss against France.

References 

1999 births
Living people
Footballers from Santiago
Chilean women's footballers
Chilean expatriate women's footballers
Chile women's international footballers
2019 FIFA Women's World Cup players
Footballers at the 2020 Summer Olympics
Olympic footballers of Chile
Women's association football forwards
Universidad de Chile footballers
Colo-Colo (women) footballers
Santiago Morning (women) footballers
Sociedade Esportiva Palmeiras (women) players
Chilean expatriate sportspeople in Brazil
Expatriate women's footballers in Brazil